Daněk (Czech feminine: Daňková) or Danek is surname and a given name. In Czech, it may literally mean "fallow deer". In general, in a number of Slavic languages Danek is a diminutive form of the given names Daniel, Danylo, Danomír, Danoslav, Bohdan, etc.

Surname
 Adrian Danek (born 1994), Polish footballer
 Benedikt Danek (born 1986), Austrian basketball player
 Jan Daněk (born 1982), Czech footballer
 Josef Danek,  Austrian slalom canoeist
 Ludvík Daněk (1937–1998), Czech athlete
 Lukáš Daněk (born 1997), Czech skier
 Michal Daněk (born 1983), Czech footballer
 Oldřich Daněk (1927–2000), Czech writer
 Václav Daněk (born 1960), Czech footballer
 Włodzimierz Danek (born 1943), Polish sports shooter

Given name
 Danek Mozdzenski (born 1952), Canadian sculptor
 Danek Nowosielski (born 1966), Canadian fencer

References

See also
 

Czech-language surnames
Polish-language surnames